The canton of Les Coteaux de Dordogne is an administrative division of the Gironde department, southwestern France. It was created at the French canton reorganisation which came into effect in March 2015. Its seat is in Castillon-la-Bataille.

It consists of the following communes:
 
Baron
Belvès-de-Castillon
Bossugan
Branne
Cabara
Camiac-et-Saint-Denis
Castillon-la-Bataille
Civrac-sur-Dordogne
Coubeyrac
Daignac
Dardenac
Doulezon
Espiet
Flaujagues
Gardegan-et-Tourtirac
Génissac
Gensac
Grézillac
Guillac
Jugazan
Juillac
Lugaignac
Mouliets-et-Villemartin
Moulon
Naujan-et-Postiac
Nérigean
Pessac-sur-Dordogne
Pujols
Rauzan
Saint-Aubin-de-Branne
Sainte-Colombe
Sainte-Florence
Saint-Émilion
Sainte-Radegonde
Sainte-Terre
Saint-Étienne-de-Lisse
Saint-Genès-de-Castillon
Saint-Germain-du-Puch
Saint-Hippolyte
Saint-Jean-de-Blaignac
Saint-Laurent-des-Combes
Saint-Magne-de-Castillon
Saint-Pey-d'Armens
Saint-Pey-de-Castets
Saint-Philippe-d'Aiguille
Saint-Quentin-de-Baron
Saint-Sulpice-de-Faleyrens
Saint-Vincent-de-Pertignas
Les Salles-de-Castillon
Tizac-de-Curton
Vignonet

References

Cantons of Gironde